Scott Beattie (born May 16, 1968) is a Canadian-Italian former professional ice hockey player and coach. Beattie led the NCAA in scoring during his sophomore season with Northern Michigan, earning several accolades to go along with the 1991 National Title.

Career
Beattie joined Northern Michigan in 1989 as a 21-year-old. A few years older than a typical freshman, Beattie's small size was a contributing factor in late arrival to the college ranks. His chance came after recording 224 points in the SJHL over the previous two seasons. Beattie brought instant offense to the Wildcats, leading the team in scoring as a freshman with 59 points. The next year Beattie exploded for 48 goals and 89 points to lead the entire NCAA in scoring and was named WCHA Player of the Year for his efforts (the only such award for Northern Michigan). With Beattie leading the attack the Wildcats won the WCHA regular season title for the first and (as of 2018) only time as well as capturing the WCHA tournament for the second time in three seasons. In the NCAA tournament Northern Michigan dominated upstart Alaska–Anchorage in both games before dispatching top eastern-seed Maine. The Wildcats netted 18 goals in the three games and they would need every bit of that offense in the title tile against Boston University as the Terriers put up 7 goals in regulation. Beattie was there to help the Wildcats match BU and the game went into overtime. The highest-scoring championship game in 34 years went the Wildcats way in the third extra frame and gave Northern Michigan its first National Title. Beattie played another year in Marquette as team captain, winning a second conference tournament, but was unable to recapture the same magic as in '91 and turned pro after his junior campaign.

Beattie had little interest from teams across North America so he played his first professional game for HC Bolzano of the Serie A in Italy. After a good season and a half he returned to the States and spent a brief time with the Detroit Falcons, Hershey Bears, South Carolina Stingrays and Saint John Flames before heading back to Italy. After a year with Milan Saima SG he was back with HC Bolzano and joined the Italian national team for the 1996 Men's World Ice Hockey Championships. Beattie spent the following year mostly with Rosenheim Star Bulls in Germany's DEL before beginning a four-year stint with four separate teams across two Swiss national leagues. During the time Beattie appeared twice more for Team Italy in international tournaments before signing on with Milano and winning three consecutive league titles. Beattie played one more year with HC Bolzano before retiring as a player in 2005.

Beattie was not idle for long as he became the GM/head coach for his hometown Kimberley Dynamiters before joining the Kootenay Ice as an assistant coach in 2008. He was an associate coach with the Tri-City Americans in 2010–11 and a year later EHC Olten named him as their head coach. Beattie was fired in November 2014 but just over a year later got his second top job with EHC Visp. That job lasted only a few months before he was promoted to the parent club SCL Tigers which, too, kept him around for only a few months before he was let go in October 2016.

Career statistics

Regular season and playoffs

International

Awards and honors

References

External links 

1968 births
Living people
Canadian ice hockey centres
Ice hockey people from British Columbia
Northern Michigan Wildcats men's ice hockey players
Saint John Flames players
Detroit Falcons (CoHL) players
Genève-Servette HC players
HC Thurgau players
Hershey Bears players
Melville Millionaires players
South Carolina Stingrays players
Starbulls Rosenheim players
Bolzano HC players
Milan-Inter HC players
HC Milano Saima players
HC Davos players
Canadian expatriate ice hockey players in Italy
Canadian expatriate ice hockey players in Germany
Canadian expatriate ice hockey players in Switzerland
NCAA men's ice hockey national champions
AHCA Division I men's ice hockey All-Americans